Ernesto Tomasi (born October 30, 1906 in Ventimiglia; died in 1997) was an Italian professional football player.

1906 births
1997 deaths
Italian footballers
Italian expatriate footballers
Expatriate footballers in France
Italian expatriate sportspeople in France
Serie A players
OGC Nice players
A.S. Roma players
Juventus F.C. players
Ligue 1 players
AS Cannes players
S.S.D. Sanremese Calcio players
A.S.D. AVC Vogherese 1919 players
Association football midfielders